

The Bleriot-SPAD S.40 was a French observation aircraft built in the early 1920s.

Design
The S.40 was a biplane with a monocoque fuselage of wood and canvas construction.

Specifications

See also

References

SPAD aircraft
Biplanes
Single-engined tractor aircraft
Aircraft first flown in 1922